Weaubleau Township is an inactive township in Hickory County, in the U.S. state of Missouri.

Weaubleau Township was established in 1881, taking its name from a creek of the same name within its borders.

References

Townships in Missouri
Townships in Hickory County, Missouri